Talabad (also Romanized as Talābād; also known as Ţālebābād, Tilāābād, and Tīlehābād) is a village in Bala Velayat Rural District, in the Central District of Kashmar County, Razavi Khorasan Province, Iran. At the 2006 census, its population was 620, in 141 families.

References 

Populated places in Kashmar County